This Comp Kills Fascists Vol. 1 is a compilation album released by Relapse Records focusing on grindcore and powerviolence bands. The LP was released by Deep Six Records. A limited edition box set of 7 7" records was released in January 2009. The album features 14 bands, 51 tracks and has a total running time of 57 minutes and 4 seconds. The album was compiled by Scott Hull of Pig Destroyer/Agoraphobic Nosebleed fame.

Many song titles and lyrics are politically charged (including the album title), mainly speaking against capitalism and fascism, some claiming that America is a fascist country. The CD artwork features a picture of George W. Bush's head with four L-shaped penises coming from his ears, mouth and top of his head that form to resemble a swastika.

Track listing
Agents of Satan - "Joe Ryder (Doomryder)"
Agents of Satan - "Rape 'em All and let God Sort 'em Out
Agents of Satan - "Skrote Skin Mask"
Agents of Satan - "Kill for Baloff"
Weekend Nachos - "Prioritize"
Weekend Nachos - "If You Come Near"
Weekend Nachos - "Scars"
Weekend Nachos - "Worthless Words"
Kill The Client - "False Flag Attack"
Kill The Client - "Triple Six Bastard"
Kill The Client - "Shithouse Lawyer"
Spoonful Of Vicodin - "Totally Brutal News Exposure"
Spoonful Of Vicodin - "Designer Track Marks"
Spoonful Of Vicodin - "I Don't Lift Weights or Drive an SUV (Because I'm Comfy with My Genitalia)"
Spoonful Of Vicodin - "Put That in Your Pipe and Smoke It"
Spoonful Of Vicodin - "Our Explanations are Longer than Our Songs"
Spoonful Of Vicodin - "Confession Booth Gloryhole"
Maruta - "Behind the Steel Curtain"
Maruta - "Chemical Tomb"
Insect Warfare - "Information Economy"
Insect Warfare - "Cellgraft"
Insect Warfare - "Disassembler"
Insect Warfare - "Cancer of Oppression"
Shitstorm - "Paranoid Existence"
Shitstorm - "Burning Alive"
Shitstorm - "Brainwashed"
Shitstorm - "Victim"
Shitstorm - "Controlling"
Shitstorm - "Mince Meat Human"
Man Will Destroy Himself - "Fuse"
Man Will Destroy Himself - "Empty"
Total Fucking Destruction - "Human is the Bastard"
Total Fucking Destruction - "In the Process of Connecting Thinking Errors"
Total Fucking Destruction - "Welcome to the Fascist Corporate Wastelands of America Part One"
Chainsaw to the Face - "Hating Life"
Chainsaw to the Face - "Skewered"
Chainsaw to the Face - "Burnt to Death"
Chainsaw to the Face - "Ripped in Half"
Magrudergrind - "Inevitable Progression"
Magrudergrind - "Heavy Bombing"
Magrudergrind - "Burden"
Brutal Truth - "Forever in a Daze"
Brutal Truth - "You Should Know Better"
Brutal Truth - "Dogs of War"
Brutal Truth - "Turmoil"
A.S.R.A - "Chytridiomycosis"
A.S.R.A - "Cancer"
A.S.R.A - "Pig Squealer"
Wasteoid - "Drink in Hand"
Wasteoid - "Bangover"
Wasteoid - "Hancuffed and Fucked"

References

External links
Information page at Relapse Records website
Information page at Amazon.co.uk
Full CD track listing

2008 compilation albums